Randolph Perkins (November 30, 1871 – May 25, 1936) was an American Republican Party politician who represented New Jersey's 6th congressional district in the United States House of Representatives from 1921 to 1936.

Early life and career
Born in Dunellen, New Jersey, Perkins moved to Jersey City, New Jersey, with his parents in 1879, where he attended Jersey City High School (since renamed William L. Dickinson High School).
He attended Cooper Union in New York City.

After studying law, he was admitted to the bar in 1893 and commenced practice in Jersey City, New Jersey.

He moved to Westfield, New Jersey, in 1902, and served as Mayor from 1903 to 1905. He moved to Woodcliff Lake, New Jersey, in 1909, and continued the practice of law.
He served as member of the New Jersey General Assembly from 1905 to 1911, serving as speaker in 1907.
He served as chairman of the Bergen County Republican committee 1911–1916.

Congress
Perkins was elected as a Republican to the Sixty-seventh and to the seven succeeding Congresses and served from March 4, 1921, until his death.
He served as chairman of the Committee on Coinage, Weights, and Measures (Sixty-ninth through Seventy-first Congresses).
He was renominated for election to the Seventy-fifth Congress at the time of his death.
He was one of the managers appointed by the House of Representatives in 1933 to prosecute the case in the impeachment trial of Harold Louderback, judge of the United States District Court for the Northern District of California, and again in 1936 to conduct the impeachment proceedings against Halsted L. Ritter, judge of the United States District Court for the Southern District of Florida.

Death
He died in Washington, D.C., on May 25, 1936, after suffering a kidney infection.
He was interred in Fairview Cemetery, West New Brighton, Staten Island, New York.

See also
 List of United States Congress members who died in office (1900–49)

References

Sources

1871 births
1936 deaths
Deaths from kidney disease
Mayors of places in New Jersey
Republican Party members of the New Jersey General Assembly
Politicians from Jersey City, New Jersey
William L. Dickinson High School alumni
People from Westfield, New Jersey
People from Woodcliff Lake, New Jersey
Politicians from Bergen County, New Jersey
Speakers of the New Jersey General Assembly
Cooper Union alumni
Republican Party members of the United States House of Representatives from New Jersey